Baker Island Light is a lighthouse on Baker Island, Maine, which is part of Acadia National Park.  The light station was established in 1828 as a guide to the southern entrance to Frenchman Bay. The present tower was built in 1855; the well-preserved tower, keeper's house, and associated outbuildings were listed on the National Register of Historic Places in 1988.

Description
The present light station includes four buildings: the tower, keeper's house, oil house, and fuel house. The tower and keeper's house were both built in 1855, the oil house is a small brick structure built in 1895, and the fuel house is a small wood-frame structure built in 1905. The keeper's house and tower were originally connected by a covered way. The brick tower had two windows in the stairwell, but these have been bricked over. The brick tower has an octagonal iron lantern house with a surrounding railing and walkway mounted on it, which is topped by a polygonal dome. When built, the station was given a fourth-order Fresnel lens.

The keeper's house is a small L-shaped wood-frame building, with a gable roof and a brick foundation.  Now finished in clapboards, it was originally clad in board-and-batten siding.  There was originally a covered passage from the house's east end covering the short distance to the tower, but this has been removed.

History
The Baker Island station was established in 1828, and was the first along Maine's coast located in the general vicinity of Mount Desert Island.  The light is an aid to navigation for reaching that island's major ports, including Bar Harbor and Northeast Harbor.  The buildings of the station are now owned and administered by Acadia National Park; the light itself is maintained by the United States Coast Guard.

See also
National Register of Historic Places listings in Hancock County, Maine
National Register of Historic Places listings in Acadia National Park

References

Lighthouses completed in 1828
Lighthouses completed in 1855
Lighthouses on the National Register of Historic Places in Maine
Lighthouses in Hancock County, Maine
Historic districts on the National Register of Historic Places in Maine
National Register of Historic Places in Acadia National Park
National Register of Historic Places in Hancock County, Maine
1828 establishments in Maine